Leon Friedman (October 23, 1886 – September 1, 1948) was a Democrat who served from 1932 to 1940 as a member of the Louisiana House of Representatives from his native Natchitoches Parish, Louisiana.

Friedman was a member of a prominent landowning Jewish family from Natchez in southern Natchitoches Parish. His father, Samuel Friedman (1848-1888), died when Leon was barely a year old. This left his mother, Caroline S. Friedman (1847-1906), as head of the household. A brother, Harry, died in 1895 at the age of fourteen. An older brother, J. Isaac Friedman, served in the state House from 1908 to 1916 and in the Louisiana State Senate for an abbreviated term from 1922 to 1924, following the resignation of Charles Milton Cunningham, the editor and publisher of The Natchitoches Times. The Friedmans are interred at the Jewish Cemetery in Natchitoches.

Leon and J. Isaac Friedman were not the first Jewish representatives from Natchitoches Parish. Earlier, Leopold Caspari, who in 1884 pushed successfully for the creation of Northwestern State University, also served in both houses of the legislature, nonconsecutively between 1884 and his death in 1915.

References

1886 births
1948 deaths
People from Natchez, Louisiana
Jewish American state legislators in Louisiana
Democratic Party members of the Louisiana House of Representatives
20th-century American politicians